Carl Friedrich Clemens Weinmüller (also Karl Weinmiller) (8 November 1764 – 16 March 1828) was an operatic bass and theatre director. A bass with the imperial court opera in Vienna, he is known for performing Rocco in the premiere of Beethoven's Fidelio.

Life 
Born in Dillingen an der Donau, Weinmüller received first musical instruction in the church choir of his hometown. He studied in Vienna. In 1783, he joined a travelling troupe that played in Wiener Neustadt, St. Pölten, Burg Haimburg and other small towns. In 1788, he moved to Ofen and Pest, where he was the first bass and the opera director.

On 6 November 1796 he started with the Viennese imperial court opera, appearing as the pharmacist Stößel in Dittersdorf's Doktor und Apotheker. He was then engaged permanently, together with his wife, by the imperial court opera. He was soon regarded as one of the most important bass singers and also known for his considerable acting talent. From July 1798 until his death, he also belonged to the Wiener Hofmusikkapelle. He enjoyed performing as a concert singer as well, for example at the academies of Joseph Haydn. His voice ranged from D to f′ at the height of his career.

In recognition of his numerous merits, Weinmüller received the citizens diploma of the City of Vienna in 1810. Together with Ignaz Saal and Johann Michael Vogl, he was instrumental in making Beethoven revise his only opera, which had failed in the premiere. Titled Fidelio in its third and final version, it was premiered on 23 May 1814 at the court theatre, with Weinmüller as Rocco.

Weinmüller retired on 30 November 1821. His last residence was Ledererhof Nr. 337, near the Altes Rathaus, where he died on March 1828 from "hardening of the liver" at age 63.

Family 
Weinmüller's wife was Aloisia Weinmüller, née Moerisch (1761-1852), who worked at the Viennese court theatres from 1796 to 1798.

References

Cited sources

Further reading 
 Constantin von Wurzbach: Weinmiller, Karl Friedrich Clemens. In Biographisches Lexikon des Kaiserthums Oesterreich. 54. Theil. Kaiserlich-königliche Hof- und Staatsdruckerei, Vienna 1886, Weinmiller, Karl Friedrich Clemens
 Katalog der Portrait-Sammlung der k. u. k. General-Intendanz der k. k. Hoftheater. Zugleich ein biographisches Hilfsbuch auf dem Gebiet von Theater und Musik. Zweite Abtheilung. Gruppe IV. Wiener Hoftheater, Vienna 1892, 
 Alexander Wheelock Thayer: Ludwig van Beethovens Leben, edited by Hermann Deiters, volume 3, Leipzig 1917
 Willy Hess: Das Fidelio-Buch, Winterthur 1986

Austrian basses
Operatic basses
1764 births
1828 deaths
People from Dillingen an der Donau